Ron Edwards or Ronald Edwards may refer to:
Buster Edwards (1931–1994), British criminal, participant in the Great Train Robbery (1963)
Ron Edwards (American football) (born 1979), American football defensive tackle
Ron Edwards (Australian politician) (born 1945), Australian former Labor Party politician from Perth
Ron Edwards (game designer) (born 1964), American indie RPG game developer
Ron Edwards (neo-Nazi), Imperial Wizard of the Imperial Klans of America, a white supremacist group
Ronald A. Edwards (1923–2014), former Chief of the South African Navy
Ronald Edwards (cricketer) (1917–2013), South African cricketer